RPN Lambak Kanan, Kampong Perpindahan Lambak Kanan or simply Lambak Kanan is a public housing estate in Brunei-Muara District, Brunei, on the outskirts of the country's capital Bandar Seri Begawan. The total population was 19,833 in 2016. Established in 1986, it is the first estate for the National Housing Scheme (RPN), the public housing programme for the country's citizens.

Geography 
Neighbouring villages include Kampong Salambigar to the east, Kampong Sungai Hanching and Kampong Sungai Tilong to the south-east, Kampong Manggis to the south, Kampong Madang to the south-west, Kampong Lambak to the west and Kampong Lambak Kiri to the north-west.

Administration 
For subdivision purposes, the estate has been divided into, and established as, five villages:

Facilities

Schools 
Sayyidina Abu Bakar Secondary School is the sole government secondary school for the estate.

The local government primary schools include:
 Dato Basir Primary School
It was renamed to the current name by the consent of Sultan Hassanal Bolkiah on 23 January 1992 in honour of a local figure who had made significant contribution to the country's education system at that time.
 Lambak Kanan Jalan 49 Primary School
 Perpindahan Lambak Kanan Jalan 10 Primary School

Two other  in the area, namely Lambak Kanan Religious School and Perpindahan Lambak Kanan Jalan 77 Religious School, have dedicated grounds.

Healthcare 
The estate is home to Berakas Health Centre, the community health centre for the residents of Mukim Berakas 'A' and Mukim Berakas 'B'.

Mosque 
Perpindahan Lambak Kanan Mosque is the local mosque; it was inaugurated in 1997 by Sultan Hassanal Bolkiah. It can accommodate 2,400 worshippers.

Miscellaneous 
Other local facilities include:
 Lambak Kanan Fire Station — operated by the Brunei Fire and Rescue Department
 Lambak Kanan Library — a branch of the country's public library system administered under Dewan Bahasa dan Pustaka Brunei. It was inaugurated in 2008.

See also 
 Kampong Lambak
 Lambak Kiri
 RPN Kampong Rimba

Notes

References 

Lambak Kanan